Mary Wiggins (February 10, 1904 – April 17, 1974) was an American composer, educator, organist, and pianist, born in Indiana, Pennsylvania. She studied composition at Carnegie-Mellon University with Roland Leich, and privately with Gladys W. Fisher and Harvey B. Gaul.

Wiggins taught organ at Schenley High School in Pittsburgh, Pennsylvania, from 1951 to 1957. She taught piano privately and at the Pittsburgh Musical Institute from 1959 to 1962, and received an award from the National Federation of Music Clubs in 1973. Her music was published by G. Schirmer Inc.

Compositions by Mary Wiggins include:

Chamber 
pieces for bassoon
pieces for organ
pieces for violin

Piano 
Catch Me! 
Cathedral Bells
Frolicking Waves

Vocal 
The Ghost

References 

American women classical composers
American classical composers
1904 births
1974 deaths
Carnegie Mellon University alumni